William Cameron Moodie (24 October 1879 – 15 July 1918) was an Australian rules footballer who played with South Melbourne and Geelong in the Victorian Football League (VFL).

Notes

External links 

1879 births
1918 deaths
Australian rules footballers from Victoria (Australia)
Sydney Swans players
Geelong Football Club players
Geelong West Football Club players
People educated at Geelong College